Southern Hotel may refer to:

in the United States
(by state)
 Southern Hotel (Perris, California), listed on the NRHP in California
 Southern Hotel (Dolores, Colorado), listed on the NRHP in Colorado
Southern Hotel (Covington, Louisiana), on National Registry of the Historic Hotels of America
 Southern Hotel (St. Louis, Missouri)
 Southern Hotel (Joliet, Montana), listed on the NRHP in Montana
 Great Southern Hotel and Theatre, Columbus, OH, listed on the NRHP in Ohio
 Southern Hotel (El Reno, Oklahoma), listed on the NRHP in Oklahoma
 Columbia Southern Hotel, Shaniko, OR, listed on the NRHP in Oregon
 New Southern Hotel, Jackson, Tennessee, listed on the NRHP in Tennessee
 Southern Hotel (Llano, Texas), listed on the NRHP in Texas